Puntsagin Sukhbat was a Mongolian wrestler.
He was born on 1964 in Nalaikh, Ulaanbaatar, Mongolia. At the 1990 FILA Wrestling World Championships he won the bronze medal in the Men's Freestyle 82 kg weight category.

References

External links
 bio on fila-wrestling.com
 Profile on sport.references.com

1964 births
2015 deaths
Wrestlers at the 1988 Summer Olympics
Wrestlers at the 1992 Summer Olympics
Mongolian male sport wrestlers
Asian Games medalists in wrestling
Wrestlers at the 1990 Asian Games
Wrestlers at the 1994 Asian Games
Olympic wrestlers of Mongolia
World Wrestling Championships medalists
Asian Games gold medalists for Mongolia
People from Bayankhongor Province
Medalists at the 1990 Asian Games
Asian Wrestling Championships medalists
20th-century Mongolian people
21st-century Mongolian people